This table ranks Nigeria's 36 states in order of their surface areas.

External links

See also
List of Nigerian states by population
Demographics of Nigeria

Area
Nigeria, area